Josef Eder (born May 2, 1942) is an Austrian bobsledder who competed in the late 1960s. He won a silver medal in the four-man event at the 1968 Winter Olympics in Grenoble.

References
 Bobsleigh four-man Olympic medalists for 1924, 1932-56, and since 1964
 DatabaseOlympics.com profile

1942 births
Austrian male bobsledders
Bobsledders at the 1968 Winter Olympics
Bobsledders at the 1972 Winter Olympics
Living people
Olympic bobsledders of Austria
Olympic silver medalists for Austria
Olympic medalists in bobsleigh
Medalists at the 1968 Winter Olympics